NGC 2404 is a massive H II region inside NGC 2403, a spiral galaxy in Camelopardalis. It was discovered on February 2, 1886 by Gulliaume Bigourdan. NGC 2404 is approximately 940 ly in diameter, making it one of the largest H II regions so far known. It is the largest H II region in NGC 2403, and lies at the outskirts of the galaxy, making for a striking similarity with NGC 604 in M33, both in size and location in the host galaxy. This H II region contains 30-40 Wolf-Rayet stars, and unlike the Tarantula Nebula, but similar to NGC 604, NGC 2404's open cluster is probably much less compact, so it probably looks like a large stellar association. This H II region is probably only a few million years old.

References 

H II regions
Camelopardalis (constellation)
2404